Resistance is the ninth studio album by New York street punk band The Casualties. It was released on September 25, 2012 on Season of Mist.

Track listing

References

2012 albums
The Casualties albums
Season of Mist albums
Albums produced by Chris "Zeuss" Harris